The United States Speedway National Championship is an annual speedway championship to decide one of the two national champions of the United States. The Championship has always been staged at Costa Mesa Speedway and dates back to 1969. Since 1998 when Costa Mesa promoters split from the AMA, the competition has run completely separately from the AMA National Speedway Championship. It is not affiliated to the FIM.

Roll of honour

References

Speedway in the United States
National speedway championships